2009 J.League Cup Final was the 17th final of the J.League Cup competition. The final was played at National Stadium in Tokyo on November 3, 2009. FC Tokyo won the championship.

Match details

See also
2009 J.League Cup

References

J.League Cup
2009 in Japanese football
FC Tokyo matches
Kawasaki Frontale matches